Alberta's rivers flow towards three different bodies of water, the Arctic Ocean, the Hudson Bay and the Gulf of Mexico. Alberta is located immediately east of the continental divide, so no rivers from Alberta reach the Pacific Ocean.

List of rivers in Alberta
The north of the province is drained towards the Arctic Ocean, and the northern rivers have comparatively higher discharge rates than the southern ones, that flow through a drier area. Most of Alberta's southern half has waters flowing toward the Hudson Bay, the only exception being the Milk River and its tributaries, that flow south through the Missouri and Mississippi River to the Gulf of Mexico.

Arctic Ocean watershed
Albertan rivers in the Arctic Ocean watershed are drained through Great Slave Lake and Mackenzie River, except for Petitot River which is drained through Liard River directly into the Mackenzie River, thus bypassing the Great Slave Lake.

Athabasca River
Chaba River
Sunwapta River
Whirlpool River
Astoria River
Miette River
Maligne River
Snaring River 
Rocky River
Snake Indian River
Fiddle River
Berland River
Wildhay River, Little Berland River, North Berland River, South Berland River
Sakwatamau River
Freeman River
Morse River
McLeod River
Gregg River, Embarras River, Erith River, Edson River
Pembina River
Lovett River, Lobstick River, Bigoray River, Paddle River, Steele River
Lesser Slave River
West Prairie River, East Prairie River, South Heart River, Driftpile River, Swan River, Assineau River, Otauwau River, Saulteaux River, Fawcett River, Marten River
Tawatinaw River 
La Biche River 
Calling River 
La Petite Riviere Jaillante
Pelican River
House River
Licock River
Algar River
Horse River 
Little Fishery River
Clearwater River
Christina River, Hangingstone River, Winefred River, Landels River, Graham Creek
Steepbank River
Mackay River
Dover River
Muskeg River
Ells River
Firebag River
Marguerite River
Richardson River
Maybelle River

Peace River
Pouce Coupe River, Clear River, Montagneuse River, Hamelin Creek, Ksituan River, Hines Creek
Saddle River
Spirit River
Smoky River
Jackpine River, Muddywater River, Sulphur River, Muskeg River, Sheep Creek, Kakwa River, Cutbank River, Simonette River, Kleskun Creek, Puskwaskau River, Bad Heart River
Little Smoky River
Waskahigan River, Iosegun River, Goose River
Wapiti River
Red Deer Creek, Belcourt Creek, Narraway River, Nose Creek, Pinto Creek, Redwillow River, Bear River
Heart River
Whitemud River
Cadotte River
Notikewin River
Wolverine River
Buffalo River
Keg River
Boyer River
Caribou River
Wabasca River
Mikkwa River, Wentzel River, Jackfish River
Lake Claire
Birch River, Harper Creek, Alice Creek, McIvor River, Mamawi Lake, Baril Lake

Slave River
Peace-Athabasca Delta
Athabasca River, Lake Athabasca, Riviere Des Roches, Chilloneys Creek, Revolution Coupe, Dempsey Creek, Peace River, Scow Channel, Murdock Creek, Darough Creek
Powder Creek
Leland Lakes
Hornaday River
Hay River
Chinchaga River
Lennard Creek, Tanghe Creek, Werniuck Creek, Sloat Creek, Vader Creek, Thordarson Creek, Waniandy Creek, Haro River, Haig River
Meader River
Steen River
Melvin River
Little Hay River
Liard Watershed (BC)
Petitot River
Yates River

Hudson Bay watershed
Albertan Rivers in the Hudson Bay watershed are drained through Saskatchewan River, Lake Winnipeg and Nelson River, except for Beaver River, which is drained through Churchill River.

North Saskatchewan River
Alexandra River
Howse River
Glacier River
Mistaya River
Siffleur River
Escarpment River
Cline River
Bighorn River
Ram River
North Ram River, Joyce River
Clearwater River
Baptiste River
Brazeau River
Nordegg River, Blackstone River, Chungo Creek, Elk River, Cardinal River, Southesk River, Cairn River
Sturgeon River
Redwater River
Death River
Vermilion River
Monnery River
Englishman River
Turtle Lake River
Jackfish River
Battle River
Spruce River
Garden River

South Saskatchewan River
Oldman River
Livingston River
Dutch Creek
Racehorse Creek
Crowsnest River
Castle River 
South Castle River
West Castle River
Carbondale River
Mill Creek
Belly River
Waterton River
St. Mary River
Little Bow River
Bow River
Pipestone River
Spray River
Cascade River
Kananaskis River
Ghost River
Elbow River
Little Elbow River
Highwood River
Sheep River
Red Deer River
Panther River
Dormer River
James River
Raven River
Little Red Deer River
Medicine River
Blindman River
Rosebud River
Raven River
North Raven River

Beaver River
Amisk River
Mooselake River
Sand River
Wolf River
Martineau River

Gulf of Mexico watershed
The small areas drained by the Milk River in southern Alberta and southwestern Saskatchewan as well as the Poplar River in southern Saskatchewan are the only areas in Canada that drain into the Gulf of Mexico.

Missouri Watershed (United States)
Milk River
North Milk River
Shanks Lake Creek
Police Creek
Lodge Creek
Sage Creek
Willow Creek
Manyberries Creek (Pakowki Lake)
Battle Creek

See also
Rivers of the Americas
Lakes of Alberta
Geography of Alberta
List of rivers of Canada

References

Alberta Environment - Alberta's River Basins
Statistics Canada - Rivers of Canada, Source: Natural Resources Canada, GeoAccess Division. Last modified: 2005-02-02.

External links

Map of watersheds in Alberta, published by Alberta's Watershed Planning and Advisory Councils

Alberta

Rivers